Lehyam, also referred to as Lekiyam refers to a traditional Indian electuary or confection.

Classification 
Classified as a product of Siddha medicine, lehyam is regarded to be a healthy body tonic, consumed to resolve digestive and respiratory problems, comprising ingredients that are easily absorbed by the body.

Ingredients and preparation 

Lehyam is prepared using powdered medicine, jaggery, sugar, honey, in an aqueous medium of water. Ghee is often added as a preserving agent, and after preparation, the food may be rolled into small balls and left to harden within a vessel, edible for up to a year.

Variations and uses 
Various forms of lehyam exist, and are named for their ingredients, and offer different properties. For instance, in Tamil Nadu, inji lekiyam, for which the salient ingredient is ginger, is offered to a new mother shortly after her delivery. Thaneervittan (asparagus) legiyam and sowbhagiyasundi (dry ginger powder) legiyam are used similarly. Nellikai lekiyam, for which the salient ingredient is gooseberry, is offered to children to boost their immunity.

In South India, lehyam is often prepared and purchased on the occasion of Deepavali to aid the digestion, and counteract the effects, of eating sweets during the festival. According to The Hindu, Deepavali legiyam, or Deepavali marundhu, is popular in Chennai, and made in many households at festival time.

Ciṭṭukkuruvi lēkiyam, prepared from sparrow meat, was once consumed for aphrodisiacal purposes.

See also 

 Traditional medicine of India

References 

Ayurveda
Siddha medicine
Diwali
Traditional medicine in India